Patrick Henry Kaddu (born 9 October 1995) is a Ugandan footballer who plays as a forward for RS Berkane in the Botola Maroc Telecom league in Morocco and for the Uganda national football team "the Cranes".

Early life
Patrick Henry Kaddu was born in a family of six to Efusa Nsubuga and Hadija Nakitende. Kaddu is the fourth born and grew up in Bbiina in the heart of Luzira, a Kampala suburb. Like all his siblings, Kaddu had a troubled education, often skipping from Mukama Kyakuwa nursery school and St James primary school for fees defaulting. But after so much persistence, in 2005, Kaddu completed his Primary Leaving Examinations, although he could not get his results because he had not cleared his fees. However, that was least of the problems as right about that time, his father sold off their home, and disappeared, leaving the rest of the family homeless.

His mother left Luzira to look for more income, but Kaddu remained in Luzira, and lived on his own, keeping up with his village football team Destiny Soccer Academy.

Club career
Kaddu first joined Maroons in 2011, but was not able to play immediately because of more established senior players like George Abege, Ibrahim Kongo and Pate Wanok. He left them in 2014, following their relegation, to join Kiira Young in the top flight for the 2014–15 season. He scored 6 goals in the league before Kiira were relegated.

He then returned to Maroons for the 2015–16 season and was the club's top-scorer with eight goals, although the club was relegated. In the FUFA Big League during the 2016–2017 season, Kaddu inspired them back into the UPL. He was the FBL's top-scorer with 18 goals in 22 games.

In 2017, Kaddu joined KCCA, but was not able to get much game time initially from coach Mike Mutebi. In June 2018, he led KCCA's line against Vipers in the Uganda cup final in Bukedea, and played a big hand in his team's winning goal and also finished the tournament with its top scorer with 7 goals. During his 2-year stint at KCCA, Kaddu scored 32 goals in 64 games for the Lugogo-based club.

RS Berkane
In August 2019, Kaddu joined RS Berkane on a 4-year deal.

Loan to Ismaily SC
In February 2020, Kaddu joined Ismaily SC on a six-month loan deal until June 30, 2020 with an option to buy for about $100k. On March 9, 2020 he scored his first goal for Ismaily SC against El Gouna FC which held to a 1–1 draw. However, the Egyptian club decided not to trigger the buying option.

Youssoufia Berrechid
On 5 December 2020, Kaddu moved to Botola club Youssoufia Berrechid on a deal for the rest of the season.

International career
On 17 November 2018, Kaddu scored his first ever international goal in a 1–0 win against Cape Verde in 2019 Africa Cup of Nations qualification, sealing Uganda's qualification in the 2019 Africa Cup of Nations.

On 12 June 2019, Kaddu was named in Uganda's 23-man squad for the 2019 Africa Cup of Nations in Egypt. On 22 June 2019, he scored in his sides 2–0 opening match win against DR Congo.

Career statistics

International

International goals
Scores and results list Uganda's goal tally first.

Honours

Club
KCCA
 Uganda Premier League: 2018-19
 Uganda Cup: 2018

Individual
Uganda Cup Top Goalscorer: 2018

References

External links

Living people
1995 births
Ugandan footballers
Ugandan expatriate footballers
Uganda international footballers
Sportspeople from Kampala
Association football forwards
2019 Africa Cup of Nations players
Kampala Capital City Authority FC players
Maroons FC players
Kiira Young FC players
RS Berkane players
Ismaily SC players
Egyptian Premier League players
Botola players
Ugandan expatriate sportspeople in Morocco
Ugandan expatriate sportspeople in Egypt
Expatriate footballers in Morocco
Expatriate footballers in Egypt